is a railway station on the Rikuu West Line in Shōnai, Yamagata, Japan, operated by East Japan Railway Company (JR East).

Lines
Kiyokawa Station is served by the Rikuu West Line, and is located 31.1 rail kilometers from the terminus of the line at Shinjō Station.

Station layout
The station has one island platform of which only one side is in use, serving a bidirectional single track. The second track is still in place, although the signaling equipment has been removed. The platform is connected to the station building by a level crossing. The station is unattended.

History
Kiyokawa Station opened on June 4, 1914. The station was absorbed into the JR East network upon the privatization of JNR on April 1, 1987. The station building was rebuilt in March 2000.

Surrounding area
Kiyokawa Post Office

See also
List of railway stations in Japan

External links

 JR East Station information 

Stations of East Japan Railway Company
Railway stations in Yamagata Prefecture
Rikuu West Line
Railway stations in Japan opened in 1914
Shōnai, Yamagata